Fuji Network System (known in Japan as simply , FNS) is a Japanese television network operated by Fuji Television Network, Inc., part of the Fujisankei Communications Group. FNS distributes entertainment and other non-news television programmes to its 28 regional television stations.

Distribution of national television news bulletins is handled by Fuji News Network, another network set up by Fuji TV.

Fuji Network System stations

External links
 FNS Official site 

Television networks in Japan
Television channels and stations established in 1969
Fuji TV